Kollengode Palace is a palace situated in Thrissur town of Thrissur district, Kerala state, India.

History
The Raja of Kollengode, Vasudeva Raja, constructed this palace in 1904 and gave it to his daughter. The original Kollengode palace(kalari kovilakam) is situated in Kollengode, Palakkad.  In 1975, the Department of Archeology acquired the property (part of Kollengode palace in Thrissur )and converted it into a museum. Some personal belongings of Vasudeva Raja are on display. The architecture of the palace is a unique blend of traditional Kerala architecture with western design. The palace now houses the Mural Art Museum (Thrissur).

The Raja of Kollengode Vasudeva Raja.

Encyclopedia of Madras Presidency 1920

References

Encyclopedia of Madras Presidency 1920

External links

Palaces in Thrissur
Tourist attractions in Thrissur
Royal residences in India
Archaeological sites in Kerala
Houses completed in 1904
1904 establishments in India
20th-century architecture in India